Novica Veličković (born 5 October 1986) is a Serbian former professional basketball player who is the team manager for Mega Basket of the Basketball League of Serbia and the ABA League. He also represented the senior Serbian national basketball team internationally.

Professional career 
Veličković started playing basketball for KK Drvomarket in 1996. Then he played for Zemun from 1998 to 2001 before signing with KK Partizan in 2001.

Partizan 
Veličković made his professional debut with Partizan during the 2004–05 season. He made his EuroLeague debut on 3 November 2005 against Pau-Orthez, scoring 2 points.
In the 2007–08 season, Veličković had a bigger role in the team. On 16 January 2008 in an 88–87 loss to Lottomatica Roma, he scored 22 points and 9 rebounds, his best game in new season. He led the team with 11 points and 4 rebounds to the EuroLeague Quarterfinals in an 82–73 win over Panathinaikos on 19 March 2008. Over the season, in 22 EuroLeague games, Veličković averaged 10.6 points, 6.9 rebounds, and 1.6 assists per game. As of 2018, Veličković was the only player to not be drafted by any NBA team in an NBA Draft.

In February 2009, he won the Serbian Cup in an 80–65 win over Crvena zvezda and he was the MVP of the competition.  On 31 March 2009, Veličković scored a career-high 26 points against CSKA Moscow. On 18 April 2009, he helped his team with 17 points and 8 rebounds in a 63–49 win over Cibona to win the 2008–09 ABA League trophy. For his performances, he was named the Adriatic League Final Four MVP. In April 2009, he won the EuroLeague Rising Star award for the 2008–09 season. Partizan finished the season by winning 8th consecutive Serbian League title, after once again defeating their archrivals, Crvena zvezda, 3–2 in the league's finals series. Veličković was named the Serbian Super League MVP and MVP of the Finals.

Real Madrid 
Veličković was seen as the first target of Real Madrid's new coach Ettore Messina. His transfer, with the signing of a two-year contract with an option for a third one, was made official on 23 June 2009. In June 2012, Real Madrid decided to release Veličković due to the numerous injuries.

2013–2016 
On 31 January 2013, he signed a short-term contract with the Serbian team Mega Vizura. In the game against Radnički Kragujevac on 12 May, he recorded season-best 37 points while shooting 11 from 16 from the field and grabbed 8 rebounds.

On 5 August 2013, Veličković signed a contract for the upcoming season with the German team Brose Baskets. He was released on 20 February 2014. Four days later, he returned to Mega Vizura for the remainder of the season.

On 21 June 2014, he signed a one-year contract with the Turkish team Trabzonspor. On 24 May 2015, he extended his contract with Trabzonspor for one more season.

Return to Partizan 
On 1 March 2016, Veličković left Trabzonspor and signed with his former club Partizan for the rest of the season. On 7 May, Veličković made his re-debut for Partizan against Borac Čačak and recorded 9 points, 2 rebounds and 3 assists.

On 14 September 2016, Veličković re-signed with Partizan for the 2016–17 season, and he became the new team captain. In March 2017, he was selected for the ideal team of the 2016–17 ABA League season, after averaging 11.2 points, 5.5 rebounds and 1.9 assists over 26 games.

On 18 September 2017, he re-signed with Partizan for the 2017–18 season. On 18 February 2018, in Final of 2017–18 Radivoj Korać Cup, Veličković played his 400th match for the club. He helped the club to win their first trophy in almost four years, with 13 points, 7 rebounds and 1 assist in an 81–75 win over Crvena zvezda. In 21 games of the 2017–18 ABA League First Division, he averaged 12.1 points, 5.3 rebounds and 2.4 assists per game.

On 10 August 2018, Veličković signed one-year contract extension with Partizan. In 2018–19 season, after struggling with conditioning and game shape in the beginning of the season, he regained trust of head coach Andrea Trinchieri and saw increased minutes until the end of the season. In the 2018–19 ABA League First Division, he averaged 4.8 points, 2.6 rebounds and 1.1 assists over 11.8 minutes played per games. Partizan defended the Radivoj Korać Cup trophy, but failed to win championships in ABA League and Serbian League.

On 18 January 2020, Veličković broke the club record with 472 games played for the club, surpassing Petar Božić at the all-time list. He won the 2019–20 Radivoj Korać Cup with Partizan in February 2020. Over 18 ABA League games, he averaged 6.3 points and 2.8 rebounds per game. In EuroCup, he appeared in 8 games and averaged 7.9 points and 4.2 rebounds before the season was cancelled due to COVID-19 pandemic. On 1 September 2020, he re-signed with Partizan.

In the 2020–21 season, which would be his last season as professional player, Veličković averaged 4.6 points and 2.6 rebounds over 17 ABA League games, while shooting 42.9% from the field goal. In Eurocup, he appeared in 5 games and averaged 5.3 points and 2.3 rebounds per game. On 8 July 2021, he announced his retirement from his basketball career at age 34. During his career, he made a record 509 appearances for Partizan.

National team career 
Veličković was a member of the U20 Serbian national teams in 2005 and 2006 in Chekhov and İzmir respectively. He made his debut with the senior Serbian national team at the EuroBasket 2007, in Spain, and he also won the silver medal at the EuroBasket 2009, in Poland. He was also a member of the Serbian national team at the 2010 FIBA World Championship, where Serbia was defeated 99-88 by Lithuania in the game for the bronze medal.

Career statistics

EuroLeague 

|-
| style="text-align:left;"| 2005–06
| style="text-align:left;" rowspan=4| Partizan
| 12 || 0 || 3.4 || .714 || .500 || .333 || .5 || .0 || .3 || .0 || 1.0 || -0.1
|-
| style="text-align:left;"| 2006–07
| 20 || 1 || 7.0 || .500 || .500 || .520 || 1.8 || .3 || .5 || .1 || 2.8 || 3.0
|-
| style="text-align:left;"| 2007–08
| 22 || 21 || 28.2 || .446 || .299 || .750 || 6.9 || 1.6 || .8 || .3 || 10.6 || 11.7
|-
| style="text-align:left;"| 2008–09
| 19 || 15 || 26.1 || .428 || .324 || .750 || 5.1 || 1.8 || .8 || .4 || 11.5 || 11.7
|-
| style="text-align:left;"| 2009–10
| style="text-align:left;" rowspan=3| Real Madrid
| 16 || 8 || 22.6 || .500 || .417 || .576 || 4.1 || 1.8 || .8 || .3 || 7.9 || 9.1
|-
| style="text-align:left;"| 2010–11
| 19 || 2 || 12.1 || .416 || .333 || .462 || 2.8 || .5 || .2 || .2 || 3.4 || 3.3
|-
| style="text-align:left;"| 2011–12
| 7 || 1 || 11.5 || .414 || .300 || .250 || 1.9 || 1.6 || .7 || .1 || 4.1 || 3.9
|-
| style="text-align:left;"| 2013–14
| style="text-align:left;"| Brose Baskets
| 5 || 4 || 20.0 || .357 || .083 || .833 || 2.8 || 1.2 || .4 || .0 || 7.2 || 4.8
|-class="sortbottom"
| style="text-align:left;"| Career
| style="text-align:left;"|
| 120 || 52 || 17.2 || .446 || .310 || .632 || 3.7 || 1.1 || .6 || .2 || 6.4 || 6.6

Career highs 
Points: 26 vs. CSKA Moscow 31/03/09
Rebounds: 13 vs. Brose Baskets 24/01/08
Assists: 7 vs. Panionios Forthnet 07/01/09
Steals: 4 vs. Unicaja Málaga 11/02/09
Blocks: 2 vs. Lottomatica Roma 09/12/10

Post-playing career 
On 28 July 2022, Mega Basket hired Veličković as their new team manager.

References

External links 

 Novica Veličković at aba-liga.com
 Novica Veličković at euroleague.net
 Novica Veličković at fiba.com
 Novica Veličković at tblstat.net
 

1986 births
Living people
ABA League players
Basketball League of Serbia players
Brose Bamberg players
KK Mega Basket players
KK Partizan players
Liga ACB players
Power forwards (basketball)
Real Madrid Baloncesto players
Serbian basketball executives and administrators
Serbia men's national basketball team players
Serbian expatriate basketball people in Germany
Serbian expatriate basketball people in Spain
Serbian expatriate basketball people in Turkey
Serbian men's basketball players
Basketball players from Belgrade
Trabzonspor B.K. players
2010 FIBA World Championship players